Rosemary Sayigh (born 1935) is a British-born journalist and scholar of Middle Eastern history. Sayigh is known for her works on the Palestinian people, particularly refugees from the Nakba who fled to  Lebanon. Her son is fellow scholar Yezid Sayigh, after marrying Yusef Sayigh in 1953. She earned her MA from the American University of Beirut in 1970 and her PhD from University of Hull in 1994.

Sayigh was a journalist with the Economist until 1970, when she left due to disgust with "the Economist's uncritical, pro-American position on the Vietnam War".

During the 2006 Lebanon War, Sayigh and her family were evacuated from their home in Beirut to Cyprus.

Writings
She is the author of Palestinians: From Peasants to Revolutionaries; A People’s History (1979, Zed Books) and Too Many Enemies: The Palestinian Experience in Lebanon (1993, Zed Books).

References

External links
 

1935 births
Living people
People from Birmingham, West Midlands
British expatriates in Lebanon
Historians of the Middle East
American University of Beirut alumni
Alumni of the University of Hull
The Economist people
Oral historians